Anastasia Borisovna Kocherzhova (born 16 October 1990) is a Russian bobsledder and former track and field sprinter. She competed in the two-woman event at the 2018 Winter Olympics. She was a silver medallist in the two-man event at the European Bobsleigh Championships in 2017.

In athletics, she won the Russian under-23 title in the 200 metres in 2012. The following year she represented Russia internationally at the 2013 Summer Universiade, placing seventh in the 200 m and fourth with the 4 × 100 metres relay quartet. She won her first national title at the Russian Athletics Championships in 2016, topping the 200 m podium.

References

External links
 

1990 births
Living people
Place of birth missing (living people)
Russian female bobsledders
Russian female sprinters
Olympic bobsledders of Russia
Bobsledders at the 2018 Winter Olympics